Madhubani is a City Municipal Corporation and headquarter of Madhubani district. Madhubani is situated in the Indian state of Bihar. It comes under Darbhanga Division. It is situated at 26 km northeast of Darbhanga City.The Madhuban Raj in Madhubani was created as a consequence. The word "Madhuban" means "forest of honey" from which Madhubani is derived, but sometimes it is also known as "madhu"+"vaani" meaning "sweet" "voice/language".

Area
 Madhubani occupies a total of 3501 km2.
 Main Rivers are Kamla, Kareh, Balan, Bhutahi Balan, Gehuan, Supen, Trishula, Jeevachh, Koshi and Adhwara Group.
 High Flood Level is 54.017 m.
 Whole District is under Earthquake Zone 5.
 Total Cropped Area – 218381 Hect.
 Barren /Uncultivable Land – 1456.5 Hect
 Land under Non-agricultural use – 51273.24 Hect
 Cultivable Barren Land – 333.32 Hect
 Permanent Pasture – 1372.71 Hect
 Miscellaneous Trees – 8835.90 Hect
 Cultivable Land – 232724 Hect
 Cropping Intensity – 134.23%

Geography
It has an average elevation of 56 metres.

Madhubani painting 
Madhubani is also famous for its world class paintings popularly called as Mithila paintings.
These paintings are created mostly by women. Natural colours are used and paintings are done on canvases, walls, floors of sacred places, etc. The painting is brightly coloured with a mix of several hues, along with a white border to all lines which is a major technique used.
This art form originated when Lord Janak asked the villagers to decorate the village to celebrate the wedding of Rama Ji and Sita Ji.
The art usually consists of scenes from the Ramayana or depicts Lord Krishan with Gopis.
Famous artists include Ms Bharti Dayal from Mithila.
Many books and picture books have been made on this artform, such as the one available online.

Demographics
 India census, Madhubani Town had a population of 166,285. Males constitute 53% of the population and females 47%. Madhubani Town has an average literacy rate of 71.06%, just above the national average of 62.39%: male literacy is 78.81%, and female literacy is 53%. In Madhubani Town, 16% of the population is under 6 years of age.

Trade
Laukaha is a nearby town close to the border of Nepalese town of Thadi. Laukaha in India and Thadi in Nepal are a part of one of the agreed route for Mutual Trade between India and Nepal and import and export to Nepal happen via Laukaha. Government of Nepal has set up a dedicated customs office in the town. and Government of India has set up a Land Customs Station with a Superintendent level officer.

Kalagram Jitwarpur are Art hub of Madhubani. Lots of Scholars are come and research about Mithila Lokchitra.

Education 
List of colleges offer Higher Education in Madhubani

 Ram Krishna College
 Madhubani Medical College and Hospital
 J N College
 Mithila Chitrakala Sansthan
 D N Y College
 Watson High School, Madhubani

 Rama Prasad Dutta Janta High School Jitwarpur
 Gokul Mathura Suri Samaj High School

Notable people 

Dhirendra Brahmachari
Arknath Chaudhary
Chandramani Datta
Mahasundari Devi
Ashish Jha
Ganganath Jha
Narendra Jha
Sriram Jha
Mangani Lal Mandal
Ramprit Mandal
Ramprit Paswan
Chaturanan Mishra
Mohan Mishra
Prem Chandra Mishra
Maṇḍana Miśra
Amrish Ranjan Pandey
Mohammad Shams Aalam Shaikh
Gajendra Thakur
Maithili Thakur
Vidyapati
Devendra Prasad Yadav
 

Lalit Narayan Mishra

References

External links
 
    Bihar Govt. Official Web Site